Angel Dust is the debut solo studio album by American rapper Indo G from Memphis, Tennessee. It was released on August 25, 1998 via Relativity Records and Hypnotize Minds. Recording sessions took place at Cotton Row Recording Studio, House of Blues Studios, and Sheldon's Crib, with producers DJ Paul and Juicy J. It features guest appearances from Gangsta Boo, Koopsta Knicca, K-Rock, Lord Infamous, Project Pat and T-Rock among others. The album peaked at number 105 on the Billboard 200 albums chart in the United States, spawning a single "Remember Me Ballin'", which made it to number 17 on the Hot Rap Songs chart.

Track listing

Chart history

References

External links

1998 albums
Indo G albums
Relativity Records albums
Albums produced by DJ Paul
Albums produced by Juicy J